Paolo Ettore Gamba from the University of Pavia, Pavia, Italy was named Fellow of the Institute of Electrical and Electronics Engineers (IEEE) in 2013 for contributions to very high resolution remote sending image processing of urban areas.

References

Fellow Members of the IEEE
Living people
Year of birth missing (living people)
Place of birth missing (living people)
Academic staff of the University of Pavia
21st-century Italian engineers